Pigespejdernes Fællesråd Danmark (PFD, The Joint Committee of Girl Guides in Denmark) is the national Guiding federation of Denmark. Danish Guiding started in 1910, the PFD was founded in 1923 and was among the founding members of the World Association of Girl Guides and Girl Scouts in 1928. The federation serves 18,893 Guides (as of 2008).

Member associations 
Full members of the federation are
 Danske Baptisters Spejderkorps (DBS, Danish Baptist Scout Association, coed)
 De grønne pigespejdere (The Green Girl Guides - YWCA, girls only)
 Det Danske Spejderkorps (DDS, The Danish Guide and Scout Association, interreligious, coed)
 Kalaallit Nunaanni Spejderit Kattufiat - Grønlands Spejderkorps (Scout Association of Greenland, interreligious, coed)

Observer status within the federation have:
 Dansk Spejderkorps Sydslesvig, affiliated to DDS
 Føroya Skótaráð
 Føroya KFUK Skótar
 Føroya Skótasamband
 Metodistkirkens Spejdere i Danmark, associated to KFUM-Spejderne i Danmark

Jamboree Denmark 2012

A Jamboree took place near Holstebro in July 2012, run jointly by member organizations of the PFD as well as the Danish Scout Council. 35,000 Scouts are expected to attend.

Emblems

See also 

 Scouting and Guiding in Denmark

References

External links 
 Danske Baptisters Spejderkorps
 De grønne pigespejdere
 Det Danske Spejderkorps

World Association of Girl Guides and Girl Scouts member organizations
Scouting and Guiding in Denmark

Youth organizations established in 1923